Aslan Beyglu (also Romanized as Aṣlān Beyglū) is a village in Mulan Rural District, in the Central District of Kaleybar County, East Azerbaijan Province, Iran. At the 2006 census, its population was 181, in 31 families.

References 

Populated places in Kaleybar County